Siaosi (George) Manumataongo ʻAlaivahamamaʻo ʻAhoʻeitu Konstantin Tukuʻaho (born 17 September 1985) is the crown prince of Tonga. Tupoutoʻa ʻUlukalala became heir apparent to the throne in March 2012 upon the accession of his father, Tupou VI, as King of Tonga.

Education
Tukuʻaho was educated at Australian National University, graduating with a Master of Military and Defence Studies in 2018 and a Master of Diplomacy in 2021.

2012 wedding 

On 12 July 2012, Crown Prince Tupoutoʻa ʻUlukalala married his double second cousin, Sinaitakala Fakafanua, in a wedding attended by 2,000 people. He was 26 years old at the time, while his wife was 25 years old. Sinaitakala Fakafanua is 26th in line to the Tongan throne.

The wedding marked the first marriage of a Tongan crown prince in sixty-five years. The ceremony was held at the Centennial Church of the Free Church of Tonga in Nuku'alofa, with more than 2,000 guests, including Samoan and Fijian chiefly families. The groom wore morning dress, while the bride wore a long sleeve, lace wedding gown with a veil that reached the floor of the church. A Maʻutohi ceremony, which celebrates the issuance of a marriage license, was held earlier in the week.

Controversy 
The marriage between the Crown Prince and Fakafanua caused controversy over the continued practice of marrying closely related cousins. Tongan royal protocol requires that members of royal family only marry members of noble families to maintain a 'strong' bloodline. All royal marriages are arranged.

The wedding between the cousins was openly criticised by a few members of Tongan political and royal circles. Two prominent members of the Tongan royal family, queen mother Halaevalu Mataʻaho ʻAhomeʻe and the king's sister, Princess Salote Pilolevu Tuita, disapproved of the marriage and refused to attend the ceremony. Daughter of the Princess Royal of Tonga, Frederica Tuita, who is ninth in line to the throne, openly condemned the union, calling the royal arranged marriage "extremely arrogant and only perpetuated the motive behind social climbers". Pro-democracy leader ʻAkilisi Pohiva also criticised the wedding, telling TVNZ, "They are too close... I do not know about biological effects of two close bloods mixed together, but I think they need new blood from outside." A leader of Tongans living in New Zealand, Will Ilolahia, stated that many Tongans opposed the second cousins' marriage, but were unwilling to speak out publicly.

An uncle of the Crown Prince, Lord Vaea, defended the marriage saying, "It's a new beginning for the royal household.  They are both in their twenties, we are looking at that to preserve that constitutional monarchy within Tonga."

Issue 
His firstborn child, a son, Prince Taufaʻahau Manumataongo, was born on 10 May 2013 at Auckland City Hospital in Auckland, becoming second in the line of succession to the Tongan throne, after his father. 

On 12 July 2014, the Crown Princess gave birth to a daughter, Princess Halaevalu Mataʻaho, at Auckland City Hospital in Auckland. 

His third child and second daughter, Princess Nanasipauʻu Eliana, was born on 20 March 2018 at the Auckland City Hospital in New Zealand.

His fourth child and third daughter, Princess Salote Mafileʻo Pilolevu, was born on 25 February 2021 at Calvary Public Hospital Bruce in Canberra.

Honours

National
 : Knight Grand Cross with Collar of the Royal Order of Pouono
 : Knight Grand Cross with Collar of the Order of Queen Salote Tupou III
 : Knight Grand Cross of the Order of the Crown of Tonga
 : Recipient of the King Tupou VI Coronation Medal

Dynastic
  Royal House of Two Sicilies: Knight Grand Cross of the Royal Order of Francis I

Ancestry

Family tree

See also 
 List of current heirs apparent

References

External links 

1985 births
Living people
Tongan royalty
Heirs apparent
Princes
Australian National University alumni
Sons of kings